Juan Manuel Alonso-Allende Allende (8 December 1918 – 10 March 1984) was a Spanish Olympic sailor that competed in three Olympic Games between 1948 and 1968. Alonso-Allende also was a world-class competitor in the Snipe, Star, Firefly and Flying Dutchman classes.

He won the Snipe class world championship in 1957. Besides, he won the first edition of the Spanish championship of the class in 1942 as a crew with his brother, José Maria, and as a skipper in 1956 and 1957.

In the Star class, he was Spanish national champion in 1943, 1945, 1947, 1966, 1967 and 1968.

Olympic Games
Alonso-Allende sailed at 3 different Olympic Games:
 19th place in Firefly at London 1948.
 11th place in Flying Dutchman at Rome 1960.
 18th place in Star at Mexico 1968.

References

External links
 
 
 
 

1918 births
1984 deaths
Spanish male sailors (sport)
Olympic sailors of Spain
Sailors at the 1948 Summer Olympics – Firefly
Sailors at the 1960 Summer Olympics – Flying Dutchman
Sailors at the 1968 Summer Olympics – Star
Snipe class world champions
World champions in sailing for Spain
Sportspeople from Bilbao
Sailors (sport) from the Basque Country (autonomous community)